The 2014 NCAA Division I Outdoor Track and Field Championships were the 93rd NCAA Men's Division I Outdoor Track and Field Championships and the 33rd NCAA Women's Division I Outdoor Track and Field Championships held for the second consecutive year at Hayward Field in Eugene, Oregon on the campus of the University of Oregon. In total, thirty-six different men's and women's track and field events were contested from June 11 to June 14, 2014.

Results

Men's events

100 meters
Final results shown, not prelims

200 meters
Final results shown, not prelims

400 meters
Final results shown, not prelims

800 meters
Final results shown, not prelims

1500 meters
Only top eight final results shown; no prelims are listed

5000 meters
Only top eight final results shown

10,000 meters
Only top eight final results shown

3000 meter steeplechase
Only top eight final results shown

110 meter hurdles
Final results shown, not prelims

400 meter hurdles
Final results shown, not prelims

4×100-meter relay
Final results shown, not prelims

4×400-meter relay
Final results shown, not prelims

Men's High Jump
Only top eight final results shown; no prelims are listed

Men's Pole Vault
Only top eight final results shown; no prelims are listed

Men's Long Jump
Only top eight final results shown; no prelims are listed

Men's Triple Jump
Only top eight final results shown; no prelims are listed

Men's Shot Put
Only top eight final results shown; no prelims are listed

Men's Discus
Only top eight final results shown; no prelims are listed

Men's Javelin
Only top eight final results shown; no prelims are listed

Men's Hammer
Only top eight final results shown; no prelims are listed

Men's Decathlon
Only top eight final results shown; no prelims are listed

Women's events

100 meters
Final results shown, not prelims

200 meters
Final results shown, not prelims

400 meters
Final results shown, not prelims

800 meters
Final results shown, not prelims

1500 meters
Only top eight final results shown; no prelims are listed

5000 meters
Only top eight final results shown

10,000 meters
Only top eight final results shown

3000 meter steeplechase
Only top eight final results shown

100 meter hurdles
Final results shown, not prelims

4x400-meter relay
Final results shown, not prelims

Women's High Jump
Only top eight final results shown; no prelims are listed

Women's Pole Vault
Only top eight final results shown; no prelims are listed

Women's Long Jump
Only top eight final results shown; no prelims are listed

Women's Triple Jump
Only top eight final results shown; no prelims are listed

Women's Shot Put
Only top eight final results shown; no prelims are listed

Women's Discus
Only top eight final results shown; no prelims are listed

Women's Javelin
Only top eight final results shown; no prelims are listed

Women's Hammer
Only top eight final results shown; no prelims are listed

Women's Heptathlon
Only top eight final results shown; no prelims are listed

See also
 NCAA Men's Division I Outdoor Track and Field Championships 
 NCAA Women's Division I Outdoor Track and Field Championships

References

NCAA Men's Outdoor Track and Field Championship
NCAA Division I Outdoor Track and Field Championships
NCAA Division I Outdoor Track and Field Championships
NCAA Women's Outdoor Track and Field Championship